Acton Smee Ayrton (5 August 1816 – 30 November 1886) was a British barrister and Liberal Party politician. Considered a radical and champion of the working classes, he served as First Commissioner of Works under William Ewart Gladstone between 1869 and 1873. He is best remembered for the "Ayrton controversy" over scientific facilities at Kew Gardens.

Background
Ayrton was the uncle of the physicist and electrical engineer William Edward Ayrton.

Political and legal career
Ayrton practised as a solicitor in Bombay, British India, and was called to the Bar, Middle Temple, in 1853. In 1857 he was elected Member of Parliament for Tower Hamlets, a seat he held until 1874. He held office in William Ewart Gladstone's first administration as Financial Secretary to the Treasury from 1868 to 1869 and as First Commissioner of Works from 1869 to 1873 and was sworn of the Privy Council in 1869.

Ayrton is best remembered for the so-called "Ayrton controversy". In an attempt, in the early 1870s, to reduce Government spending, Ayrton (as First Commissioner of Works) encouraged a proposal that the costly scientific functions of Kew Gardens should be transferred and that the gardens should be retained purely as a public park. This prompted a confrontation with Joseph Dalton Hooker (Director at Kew), who enlisted the support of Charles Darwin and Charles Lyell, amongst other scientific luminaries. After debates in both Houses of Parliament, Ayrton was transferred to the post of Judge Advocate General and the proposal failed.

Ayrton remained as Judge Advocate General until the Gladstone government fell in February 1874. He lost his seat in parliament in the general election of that year and never returned to the House of Commons.

In the Palace of Westminster the lantern at the top of the Elizabeth Tower (commonly called Big Ben) is called the Ayrton Light, lit when either House of Parliament is sitting after dark. It was installed in 1885 at the request of Queen Victoria so that she could see from Buckingham Palace when the members were sitting and named after Ayrton.

Personal life
For the last few years of his life, he was a daily frequenter of the Reform Club.
He died at the Mount Dore Hotel, Bournemouth, on 30 November 1886.

He is buried in Brompton Cemetery, London.

References

Attribution

External links
Caricatures of Acton Smee Ayrton at the National Portrait Gallery
 

1816 births
1886 deaths
Burials at Brompton Cemetery
Liberal Party (UK) MPs for English constituencies
Members of the Privy Council of the United Kingdom
UK MPs 1857–1859
UK MPs 1859–1865
UK MPs 1865–1868
UK MPs 1868–1874
Members of the Middle Temple
19th-century British people
Lawyers from London